Lori Hallier (born July 8, 1959) is a Canadian film, stage, and television actress. She made her film debut in 1981, starring as Sarah Mercer in George Mihalka's slasher film My Bloody Valentine (1981). She subsequently starred in Warning Sign (1985), Night of the Twisters (1996), My Name Is Tanino (2002), and Monte Walsh (2003). Hallier had a recurring role as Shannon Pressman in the television series Santa Barbara (1990). In  2017, Hallier portrayed Alice in the Netflix comedy film Christmas Inheritance.

Early life
Hallier was born July 8, 1959 in Victoria, British Columbia, Canada, to Gerry and Vivian Hallier. She has two siblings: a sister, Kerry, and brother, Dale. Hallier was raised in Victoria, where she attended the Reynolds Secondary School. She studied theatre for two years at the University of Victoria before graduating from the National Theatre School in Montreal in 1980.

Career
Hallier made her film debut as Sarah Mercer in the 1981 cult classic slasher film My Bloody Valentine. After filming My Bloody Valentine in Nova Scotia, Hallier returned to Victoria, where she appeared in stage productions for the Bastion Theatre Company, as well as a production of Names and Nicknames with Richard Margison.

In 1982, Hallier appeared in a short-run Showtime soap opera entitled Love at the Crossroads, opposite George Touliatos, Eve Crawford, and Vivian Reis, in which she portrays Michelle, a starlet attempting to make it in Hollywood. A review on the series in the Akron Beacon Journal dismissed the series, but noted: "Lori Hallier and Eve Crawford vindicate themselves despite the horrid script; their performances are better than those in most daytime soaps."

The following year, she appeared in two episodes of the Canadian series Loving Friends and Perfect Couples, after which she relocated to Los Angeles, California, to pursue further work in television. She made appearances on several 1980s American television series such as The Dukes of Hazzard, Trapper John, M.D., and Simon & Simon. In 1986, Hallier co-starred with Harvey Keitel in the thriller Blindside, and in 1989 she appeared as Yvette on the popular soap opera Days of Our Lives, following this role with a recurring role as Shannon Pressman on the daytime drama Santa Barbara in 1990.

In 1996, Hallier appeared in the horror film Night of the Twisters. After appearing in the television movies Leona Helmsley: The Queen of Mean and A Woman Scorned: The Betty Broderick Story, Hallier would become associated with supernatural and science fiction through her work on series such as Star Trek: Voyager and Poltergeist: The Legacy in 1997.

In 2000, she portrayed Joanna Lanier in the television series In a Heartbeat. In 2002, she was cast in the film My Name Is Tanino. The following year, she starred in the popular Canadian program Strange Days at Blake Holsey High, followed by a supporting role in the Western Monte Walsh (2003), opposite Tom Selleck and Isabella Rosselini. In 2008, she appeared in a supporting role in the Canadian-produced miniseries The Summitt, opposite Bruce Greenwood, Christopher Plummer, and Wendy Crewson.

In 2017, Hallier portrayed Alice in the Netflix comedy film Christmas Inheritance, opposite Eliza Taylor, Jake Lacy, and Andie MacDowell.

Personal life
Hallier lived in Los Angeles, California for seventeen years after relocating there in the mid-1980s. In a 2009 interview, she recalled: "I went on a lark and drove around in a rented convertible and lived the high life. My hair turned white, my skin turned brown. I had big hair, shoulder pads, big earrings. The '80s were a fun time... [but Los Angeles] is a torture chamber of expectations." As of 2009, she resided in Toronto, Ontario.

Filmography

Film

Television

References

External links
 
 Lori Hallier at TV Guide

1959 births
20th-century Canadian actresses
21st-century Canadian actresses
Actresses from Victoria, British Columbia
Canadian film actresses
Canadian television actresses
Living people
National Theatre School of Canada alumni
University of Victoria alumni